The ciliospinal center (in Latin: centrum ciliospinale) is a structure which receives input from the pretectum, and has output to the superior cervical ganglion.

It is located in the intermediolateral cell columns (IMLCC) of the spinal cord between C8 and T2.

It plays a role in the control of the iris dilator muscle. It is also known as "Budge's center", or "centre".

It is associated with a reflex identified by Augustus Volney Waller and Ludwig Julius Budge in 1852.

See also 
 Horner's syndrome

References

Spinal cord